Gheorghe Vergil Şerbu (born 29 March 1949) is a Romanian politician and Member of the European Parliament. Şerbu is a member of the National Liberal Party, part of the Alliance of Liberals and Democrats for Europe, and became an MEP on 1 January 2007 with the accession of Romania to the European Union.

External links
European Parliament profile

1949 births
Living people
National Liberal Party (Romania) politicians
National Liberal Party (Romania) MEPs
MEPs for Romania 2007
Place of birth missing (living people)